Brendan Corish (19 November 1918 – 17 February 1990) was an Irish Labour Party politician who served as Tánaiste and Minister for Health from 1973 to 1977, Leader of the Labour Party, Minister for Social Welfare from 1954 to 1957 and from 1973 to 1977, Parliamentary Secretary to the Minister for Defence and Parliamentary Secretary to the Minister for Local Government from 1948 to 1951. He was a Teachta Dála (TD) from 1948 to 1982.

Early and personal life
He was born at William Street in Wexford town. His father, Richard Corish, a well-known trade union official and Sinn Féin member, had been elected to the Second Dáil shortly after the birth of his son and later joined the Labour Party, serving as a local and national politician until his death in 1945. His mother was Catherine Bergin.

He was educated locally at Wexford CBS and, in his youth, was a member of the 1st Wexford Scout troop (Scouting Ireland). At the age of nineteen, he joined the clerical staff of Wexford County Council.

He was married to Phyllis, and they had three sons.

He spent several years playing Gaelic football for the Wexford county team.

Political career
Corish was elected to Dáil Éireann as a Labour Party candidate in the Wexford by-election in 1945, necessitated by the death of his father who was the sitting TD. He took a seat on the fractured opposition benches, as Fianna Fáil's grip on power continued.

He retained his seat at the 1948 general election in which Fianna Fáil was returned as the largest party in the Dáil once again. However, Fine Gael, the Labour Party, the National Labour Party, Clann na Poblachta, Clann na Talmhan and a number of Independent candidates all came together to form the first inter-party government. Corish was appointed Parliamentary Secretary to the Ministers for Defence and Local Government.

When the Second Inter-party Government was formed after the 1954 general election, Corish was appointed Minister for Social Welfare.

In 1960 Corish succeeded William Norton as Labour Party leader. He introduced new policies which made the party more socialist in outlook and described the party program as Christian socialist. Corish considered that the party principles were those endorsed by Pope John XXIII and greatly admired the Pope who he said was "one of the greatest contributors of all changes in Irish attitudes". However, the party moved carefully because 'socialism' was still considered a dirty word in 1960s Ireland. Corish claimed that Ireland would be 'Socialist in the Seventies'. To a certain extent he was right because Fine Gael and the Labour Party formed a coalition government between 1973 and 1977. Corish became Tánaiste and Minister for Health and Social Welfare.

Corish was deeply religious, telling the Dáil in 1953 that "I am an Irishman second, I am a catholic first...if the hierarchy give me any direction with regard to catholic social teaching or catholic moral teaching, I accept without qualification in all respects the teaching of the hierarchy and the church to which I belong".

In 1977, the Taoiseach Liam Cosgrave called a general election, and Fianna Fáil was returned to power in a landslide victory. Corish resigned as leader of the Labour Party, having signalled his intent to do so before the election. He was succeeded as party leader by Frank Cluskey. Corish retired from politics completely at the February 1982 general election.

Death
Brendan Corish died on 17 February 1990 in Wexford at the age of 71.

Works
The New Republic (February 1968)

References

 

1918 births
1990 deaths
Irish Christian socialists
Irish sportsperson-politicians
Labour Party (Ireland) TDs
Leaders of the Labour Party (Ireland)
Members of the 12th Dáil
Members of the 13th Dáil
Members of the 14th Dáil
Members of the 15th Dáil
Members of the 16th Dáil
Members of the 17th Dáil
Members of the 18th Dáil
Members of the 19th Dáil
Members of the 20th Dáil
Members of the 21st Dáil
Members of the 22nd Dáil
Ministers for Health (Ireland)
Ministers for Social Affairs (Ireland)
Parliamentary Secretaries of the 13th Dáil
Politicians from County Wexford
Presidential appointees to the Council of State (Ireland)
Tánaistí
People from Wexford, County Wexford
Wexford inter-county Gaelic footballers